Jan Velkoborský (born 14 July 1975) is a Czech former professional footballer who played as a defender. He played international football for the Czech Republic national team.

References

External links
 

1975 births
Living people
Sportspeople from Plzeň
Association football defenders
Czech footballers
Czech Republic under-21 international footballers
Czech Republic international footballers
Czech First League players
2. Bundesliga players
3. Liga players
FC Viktoria Plzeň players
FK Chmel Blšany players
Rot Weiss Ahlen players
FC Baník Ostrava players
FK Viktoria Žižkov players
SV Elversberg players
Czech expatriate footballers
Expatriate footballers in Germany
Czech expatriate sportspeople in Germany